The 2019 Los Angeles Angels season was the 59th season of the Angels franchise and the 54th in Anaheim (all of them at Angel Stadium). They failed to qualify for the postseason for the fifth straight year, finishing the season with a 72-90 record.

On July 1, 2019, Angels' pitcher Tyler Skaggs died at the age of 27 while in  Texas before a series against the Texas Rangers.

Regular season

Season standings

American League West

American League Leaders

Game log

|-style=background:#fbb
| 1 || March 28 || @ Athletics || 0–4 || Fiers (1–0) || Cahill (0–1) || — || 22,961 || 0–1 || L1
|-style=background:#bfb
| 2 || March 29 || @ Athletics || 6–2 || Robles (1–0) || Soria (0–1) || — || 22,585 || 1–1 || W1
|-style=background:#fbb
| 3 || March 30 || @ Athletics || 2–4 || Anderson (1–0) || Peña (0–1) || Treinen (1) || 16,051 || 1–2 || L1 
|-style=background:#fbb
| 4 || March 31 || @ Athletics || 1–2 || Montas (1–0) || Skaggs (0–1) || Treinen (2) || 23,265 || 1–3 || L2
|-

|-style=background:#fbb
| 5 || April 1 || @ Mariners || 3–6 || Hernández (1–0) || Stratton (0–1) || Elías (1) || 14,463 || 1–4 || L3
|-style=background:#fbb
| 6 || April 2 || @ Mariners || 1–2 || Gonzales (3–0) || García (0–1) || Swarzak (1) || 13,567 || 1–5 || L4 
|-style=background:#fbb
| 7 || April 4 || Rangers || 4–11 || Springs (1–0) || Harvey (0–1) || — || 42,027 || 1–6 || L5
|-style=background:#bfb
| 8 || April 5 || Rangers || 3–1 || Anderson (1–0) || Lynn (0–1) || Allen (1) || 41,089 || 2–6 || W1 
|-style=background:#bfb
| 9 || April 6 || Rangers || 5–1 || Skaggs (1–1) || Smyly (0–1) || — || 31,747 || 3–6 || W2 
|-style=background:#bfb
| 10 || April 7 || Rangers || 7–2 || Anderson (2–0) || Miller (0–1) || — || 42,076 || 4–6 || W3 
|-style=background:#bfb
| 11 || April 8 || Brewers || 5–2 || Cahill (1–1) || Chacín (2–1) || Allen (2) || 28,571 || 5–6 || W4 
|-style=background:#bfb
| 12 || April 9 || Brewers || 11–8 || Bedrosian (1–0) || Claudio (0–1) || Allen (3) || 28,793 || 6–6 || W5 
|-style=background:#bfb
| 13 || April 10 || Brewers || 4–2 || Barría (1–0) || Woodruff (1–1) || Robles (1) || 34,446 || 7–6 || W6 
|-style=background:#fbb
| 14 || April 12 || @ Cubs || 1–5 || Hamels (2–0) || Skaggs (1–2) || — || 30,102 || 7–7 || L1
|-style=background:#bfb
| 15 || April 13 || @ Cubs || 6–5 || Buttrey (1–0)|| Hendricks (0–3) || Allen (4) || 38,755 || 8–7 || W1
|-style=background:#bbb
| — || April 14 || @ Cubs ||colspan="8"|Postponed (inclement weather) (Makeup date: June 3)
|-style=background:#fbb
| 16 || April 15 || @ Rangers || 7–12 || Dowdy (1–0) || Bedrosian (1–1) || Leclerc (4) || 18,265 || 8–8 || L1 
|-style=background:#fbb
| 17 || April 16 || @ Rangers || 0–5 || Minor (2–1) || Barría (1–1) || — || 17,704 || 8–9 || L2 
|-style=background:#fbb
| 18 || April 17 || @ Rangers || 4–5 || Lynn (2–1) || Harvey (0–2) || Leclerc (5) || 16,691 || 8–10 || L3
|-style=background:#fbb
| 19 || April 18 || Mariners || 10–11 || Swarzak (2–0) || Allen (0–1) || Elías (3) || 33,592 || 8–11 || L4 
|-style=background:#fbb
| 20 || April 19 || Mariners || 3–5 || Rosscup (2–0) || Allen (0–2) || Elías (4) || 41,021 || 8–12 || L5
|-style=background:#fbb
| 21 || April 20 || Mariners || 5–6 || Kikuchi (1–1) || Cahill (1–2) || Swarzak (3) || 41,147 || 8–13 || L6
|-style=background:#bfb
| 22 || April 21 || Mariners || 8–6 || Barría (2–1) || Leake (2–2) || García (1) || 34,155 || 9–13 || W1 
|-style=background:#fbb
| 23 || April 22 || Yankees || 3–4 (14) || Holder (1–0) || Bard (0–1) || — || 35,403 || 9–14 || L1 
|-style=background:#fbb
| 24 || April 23 || Yankees || 5–7 || Germán (4–1)|| Stratton (0–2) || Britton (1) || 38,016 || 9–15 || L2
|-style=background:#fbb
| 25 || April 24 || Yankees || 5–6 || Loáisiga (1–0) || Buttrey (1–1) || Chapman (4) || 37,928 || 9–16 || L3
|-style=background:#bfb
| 26 || April 25 || Yankees || 11–5 || Ramirez (1–0)|| Tanaka (2–2) || — || 39,584 || 10–16 || W1
|-style=background:#bfb
| 27 || April 26 || @ Royals || 5–1 || Skaggs (2–2) || Duffy (0–1) || — || 23,186 || 11–16 || W2
|-style=background:#fbb
| 28 || April 27 || @ Royals || 4–9 || Barlow (1–0) || Barría (2–2) || — || 18,755 || 11–17 || L1
|-style=background:#bfb
| 29 || April 28 || @ Royals || 7–3 || Harvey (1–2) || Bailey (2–3) || — || 21,549 || 12–17 || W1
|-style=background:#bfb
| 30 || April 30 || Blue Jays || 4–3 || Buttrey (2–1) || Tepera (0–1) || Robles (2) || 38,797 || 13–17 || W2 
|-

|-style=background:#bfb
| 31 || May 1 || Blue Jays || 6–3 || Peña (1-1) || Stroman (1-4) || Buttrey (1) || 33,082 || 14–17 || W3
|-style=background:#bfb
| 32 || May 2 || Blue Jays || 6–2 || Skaggs (3-2) || Sanchez (3-2) || — || 40,064 || 15–17 || W4
|-style=background:#fbb
| 33 || May 4 @ Estadio de Béisbol Monterrey || Astros || 2–14 || Miley (2-2) || Cahill (1-3) || — || 18,177 || 15–18 || L1
|-style=background:#fbb
| 34 || May 5 @ Estadio de Béisbol Monterrey || Astros || 4–10 || Verlander (5-1) || Harvey (1-3) || — || 17,614 || 15–19 || L2
|-style=background:#bfb
| 35 || May 7 || @ Tigers || 5–2 || Canning (1-0) || Norris (1–1) || Robles (3) || 14,169 || 16–19 || W1 
|-style=background:#fbb
| 36 || May 8 || @ Tigers || 3–10 || Boyd (4-2) || Skaggs (3-3) || — || 13,224 || 16–20 || L1
|-style=background:#bfb
| 37 || May 9 || @ Tigers || 13–0 || Peña (2-1) || Carpenter (0-1) || — || 16,404 || 17–20 || W1
|-style=background:#bfb
| 38 || May 10 || @ Orioles || 8–3 || Cahill (2-3) || Straily (1-3) || — || 14,495 || 18–20 || W2
|-style=background:#bfb
| 39 || May 11 || @ Orioles || 7–2 || Bard (1-0) || Bundy (1-5) || — || 21,106 || 19–20 || W3
|-style=background:#fbb
| 40 || May 12 || @ Orioles || 1–5 || Means (5-3) || Canning (1-1) || — || 16,387 || 19–21 || L1
|-style=background:#bfb
| 41 || May 13 || @ Twins || 5–4 || Skaggs (4-3) || Berríos (6-2) || Robles (4) || 21,359 || 20–21 || W1
|-style=background:#fbb
| 42 || May 14 || @ Twins || 3–4 || Gibson (4-1) || Bedrosian (1-2) || Parker (7) || 26,747 || 20-22 || L1
|-style=background:#fbb
| 43 || May 15 || @ Twins || 7–8 || Odorizzi (6-2) || Cahill (2-4) || Morin (1) || 31,919 || 20–23 || L2
|-style=background:#bfb
| 44 || May 17 || Royals || 5–2 || Harvey (2-3) || Keller (2-5) || Robles (5) || 43,444 || 21–23 || W1
|-style=background:#bfb
| 45 || May 18 || Royals || 6–3 || Canning (2-1) || Junis (3-5) || Buttrey (2) || 43,415 || 22–23 || W2
|-style=background:#fbb
| 46 || May 19 || Royals || 1–5 || Duffy (3-1) || Skaggs (4-4) || — || 43,329 || 22–24 || L1
|-style=background:#fbb
| 47 || May 20 || Twins || 1–3 || Rogers (1-0) || Buttrey (2-2) || Parker (8) || 34,177 || 22–25 || L2
|-style=background:#fbb
| 48 || May 21 || Twins || 3–8 || Pineda (4-3) || Bard (1-2) || — || 32,316 || 22–26 || L3
|-style=background:#bbb
| 49 || May 22 || Twins || colspan=7 | Postponed (rain) Makeup date: May 23
|-style=background:#fbb
| 49 || May 23 || Twins || 7–16 || Pérez (7-1) || Harvey (2-4) || — || 30,992 || 22–27 || L4
|-style=background:#fbb
| 50 || May 24 || Rangers || 3–4 || Smyly (1-3) || Smyly (1-3) || Kelley (5) || 43,806 || 22–28 || L5
|-style=background:#bfb
| 51 || May 25 || Rangers || 3–2 || Robles (2–0) || Kelley (3–1) || — || 36,392 || 23–28 || W1
|-style=background:#bfb
| 52 || May 26 || Rangers || 7–6 || García (1–1) || Springs (2–1) ||  Anderson (1) || 39,406 || 24–28 || W2
|-style=background:#fbb
| 53 || May 27 || @ Athletics || 5–8 || Bassitt (3–1) || Cahill (2–5) || Treinen (11) || 20,409 || 24–29 || L1
|-style=background:#bfb
| 54 || May 28 || @ Athletics || 6–4 || Buttrey (3–2) || Soria (1–4) || Robles (6) || 13,060 || 25–29 || W1
|-style=background:#bfb
| 55 || May 29 || @ Athletics || 12–7 (11) || Ramirez (2–0) || Trivino (2–1) || — || 21,185 || 26–29 || W2
|-style=background:#bfb
| 56 || May 30 || @ Mariners || 9–3 || Peña (3–1) || Kikuchi (3–3) || — || 13,972 || 27–29 || W3
|-style=background:#fbb
| 57 || May 31 || @ Mariners || 3–4 || Leake (4–6) || Skaggs (4–5) || Bass (1) || 32,164 || 27–30 || L1
|-

|-style=background:#bfb
| 58 || June 1 || @ Mariners || 6–3 || Bedrosian (2–3) || Brennan (2–3) || Robles (7) || 28,128 || 28–30 || W1
|-style=background:#bfb
| 59 || June 2 || @ Mariners || 13–3 || Suárez (1–0) || Gonzales (5–6) || — || 28,912 || 29–30 || W2
|-style=background:#fbb
| 60 || June 3 || @ Cubs || 1–8 || Lester (4–4) || Cahill (2–6) || — || 39,843 || 29–31 || L1
|-style=background:#fbb
| 61 || June 4 || Athletics || 2–4 || Montas (7–2) || Canning (2–2) || Treinen (12) || 36,009 || 29–32 || L2
|-style=background:#bfb
| 62 || June 5 || Athletics || 10–9 || Robles (3–0) || Trivino (2–4) || — || 36,065 || 30–32 || W1
|-style=background:#fbb
| 63 || June 6 || Athletics || 4–7 || Fiers (5–3) || Skaggs (4–6) || — || 34,109 || 30–33 || L1
|-style=background:#fbb
| 64 || June 7 || Mariners || 2–6 || Gonzales (6–6) || Heaney (0–1) || — || 41,495 || 30–34 || L2
|-style=background:#bfb
| 65 || June 8 || Mariners || 12–3 || Peters (1–0) || Kikuchi (3–4) || — || 40,569 || 31–34 || W1
|-style=background:#fbb
| 66 || June 9 || Mariners || 3–9 || LeBlanc (3–2) || Suárez (1–1) || — || 41,614 || 31–35 || L1
|-style=background:#bfb
| 67 || June 10 || Dodgers || 5–3 || Buttrey (4–2) || Kelly (1–3) || Robles (8) || 45,477 || 32–35 || W1
|-style=background:#bfb
| 68 || June 11 || Dodgers || 5–3 || Peña (4–1) || Maeda (7–3) || Robles (9) || 45,404 || 33–35 || W2
|-style=background:#bfb
| 69 || June 13 || @ Rays || 5–3 || Skaggs (5–6) || Yarbrough (5–3) || Bedrosian (1) || 15,291 || 34–35 || W3
|-style=background:#fbb
| 70 || June 14 || @ Rays || 4–9 || Pagán (2–1) || Buttrey (4–3) || — || 21,598 || 34–36 || L1
|-style=background:#bfb
| 71 || June 15 || @ Rays || 5–3 || Suárez (2–1) || Morton (8–1) || Robles (10) || 22,320 || 35–36 || W1
|-style=background:#fbb
| 72 || June 16 || @ Rays || 5–6 || Poche (1–1) || Canning (2–3) || Castillo (7) || 20,508 || 35–37 || L1
|-style=background:#bfb
| 73 || June 17 || @ Blue Jays || 10–5 || Peña (5–1) || Jackson (1–5) || — || 15,227 || 36–37 || W1
|-style=background:#bfb
| 74 || June 18 || @ Blue Jays || 3–1 || Skaggs (6–6) || Stroman (4–9) || Robles (11) || 17,259 || 37–37 || W2
|-style=background:#bfb
| 75 || June 19 || @ Blue Jays || 11–6 || Ramirez (3–0) || Sanchez (3–9) || — || 16,225 || 38–37 || W3
|-style=background:#fbb
| 76 || June 20 || @ Blue Jays || 5–7  || Kingham (2–1) || Buttrey (4–4) || — || 24,291 || 38–38 || L1
|-style=background:#fbb
| 77 || June 21 || @ Cardinals || 1–5 || Wacha (5–3) || Canning (2–4) || — || 48,423 || 38–39 || L2
|-style=background:#fbb
| 78 || June 22 || @ Cardinals || 2–4 || Hudson (6–3) || Peña (5–2) || Webb (1) || 46,711 || 38–40 || L3
|-style=background:#bfb
| 79 || June 23 || @ Cardinals || 6–4 || Skaggs (7–6) || Mikolas (5–8) || — || 47,114 || 39–40 || W1
|-style=background:#bfb
| 80 || June 25 || Reds || 5–1 || Heaney (1–1) || Mahle (2–8) || — || 37,260 || 40–40 || W2
|-style=background:#bfb
| 81 || June 26 || Reds || 5–1 || Bedrosian (3–3) || Iglesias (1–7) || — || 35,272 || 41–40 || W3
|-style=background:#bfb
| 82 || June 27 || Athletics || 8–3 || Canning (3–4) || Anderson (0–3) || — || 40,231 || 42–40 || W4
|-style=background:#fbb
| 83 || June 28 || Athletics || 2–7 || Fiers (8–3) || Ramirez (3–1) || — || 41,913 || 42–41 || L1
|-style=background:#fbb
| 84 || June 29 || Athletics || 0–4 || Anderson (8–5) || Skaggs (7–7) || — || 41,447 || 42–42 || L2
|-style=background:#fbb
| 85 || June 30 || Athletics || 3–12 || Bassitt (5–3) || Heaney (1–2) || — || 37,668 || 42–43 || L4
|-

|-style=background:#bbb
| – || July 1 || @ Rangers || colspan=7 | Postponed (passing away of P Tyler Skaggs) Makeup date: August 20
|-style=background:#bfb
| 86 || July 2 || @ Rangers || 9–4 || Cahill (3–6) || Fairbanks (0–2) || — || 20,931 || 43–43 || W1
|-style=background:#bfb
| 87 || July 3 || @ Rangers || 6–2 || Barría (3–2 || Jurado (5–4) || — || 28,998 || 44–43 || W2
|-style=background:#fbb
| 88 || July 4 || @ Rangers || 3–9 || Lynn (11–4) || Canning (3–5) || — || 45,566 || 44–44 || L1
|-style=background:#bfb
| 89 || July 5 || @ Astros || 5–4 || Peña (6–2) || Verlander (10–4) || Robles (12) || 41,219 || 45–44 || W1
|-style=background:#fbb
| 90 || July 6 || @ Astros || 0–4 || Cole (9–5) || Heaney (1–3) || — || 39,470 || 45–45 || L1
|-style=background:#fbb
| 91 || July 7 || @ Astros || 10–11  || Pressly (2–1) || Cole (0–1) || — || 37,264 || 45–46 || L2
|-style=background:#bcf
| ASG || July 9 || NL @ AL || 4–3 || Tanaka (1–0) || Kershaw (0–1) || Chapman (1) || 36,747 || 45–46 || N/A
|-style=background:#bfb
| 92 || July 12 || Mariners || 13–0 || Peña (7–2) || Leake (7–8) || — || 43,140 || 46–46 || W1
|-style=background:#bfb
| 93 || July 13 || Mariners || 9–2 || Harvey (3–4) || LeBlanc (5–3) || — || 41,549 || 47–46 || W2
|-style=background:#bfb
| 94 || July 14 || Mariners || 6–3 || Buttrey (5–4) || Bass (1–3) || Robles (13) || 38,560 || 48–46 || W3
|-style=background:#bfb
| 95 || July 15 || Astros || 9–6 || Anderson (3–0) || Valdez (3–6) || Robles (14) || 35,431 || 49–46 || W4
|-style=background:#bfb
| 96 || July 16 || Astros || 7–2 || Ramirez (4–1) || Rondón (3–2) || — || 42,678 || 50–46 || W5
|-style=background:#fbb
| 97 || July 17 || Astros || 2–11 || Cole (10–5) || Peña (7–3) || — || 35.738 || 50–47 || L1
|-style=background:#fbb
| 98 || July 18 || Astros || 2–6 || Miley (8–4) || Harvey (3–5) || — || 35,928 || 50–48 || L2
|-style=background:#fbb
| 99 || July 19 || @ Mariners || 0–10 || Leake (8–8) || Barría (3–3) || — || 19,976 || 50–49 || L3
|-style=background:#bfb
| 100 || July 20 || @ Mariners || 6–2 || Buttrey (6–4) || Elías (2–2) || — || 30,927 || 51–49 || W1
|-style=background:#bfb
| 101 || July 21 || @ Mariners || 9–3 || Peters (2–0) || Kikuchi (4–7) || — || 24,767 || 52–49 || W2
|-style=background:#bfb
| 102 || July 23 || @ Dodgers || 5–4 || Peña (8–3) || Maeda (7–7) || Robles (15) || 53,725 || 53–49 || W3
|-style=background:#bfb
| 103 || July 24 || @ Dodgers || 3–2 || Barría (4–3) || Stripling (4–4) || Robles (16) || 53,731 || 54–49 || W4
|-style=background:#fbb
| 104 || July 25 || Orioles || 8–10 (16) || Scott (1-0) || Canning (3–6) || Wilkerson (1) || 36,214 || 54–50 || L1
|-style=background:#fbb
| 105 || July 26 || Orioles || 3–9 || Wojciechowski (2–3) || Tropeano (0–1) || — || 38,852 || 54–51 || L2
|-style=background:#fbb
| 106 || July 27 || Orioles || 7–8 || Bleier (2–0) || Buttrey (6–5) || Givens (9) || 42,289 || 54–52 || L3
|-style=background:#bfb
| 107 || July 28 || Orioles || 5–4 || Cole (1–1) || Givens (1–5) || — || 35,447 || 55–52 || W1
|-style=background:#fbb
| 108 || July 29 || Tigers || 2–7 || Zimmermann (1–8) || Barría (4–4) || — || 35,457 || 55–53 || L1
|-style=background:#bfb
| 109 || July 30 || Tigers || 6–1 || Canning (4–6) || VerHagen (1–2) || — || 33,907 || 56–53 || W1
|-style=background:#fbb
| 110 || July 31 || Tigers || 1–9 || Norris (3–8) || Suárez (2–2) || — || 37,511 || 56–54 || L1 
|-

|-style=background:#fbb
| 111 || August 2 || @ Indians || 3–7 || Clevinger (6–2) || Cole (1–2) || — || 28,386 || 56–55 || L2
|-style=background:#fbb
| 112 || August 3 || @ Indians || 2–7 || Plutko (4–2) || Cahill (3–7) || — || 31,222 || 56–56 || L3
|-style=background:#fbb
| 113 || August 4 || @ Indians || 2–6 || Bieber (10–4) || Barria (4–5) || — || 26,099 || 56–57 || L4
|-style=background:#fbb
| 114 || August 5 || @ Reds || 4–7 || Castillo (11–4) || Cole (1–3) || Iglesias (22) || 21,895 || 56–58 || L5
|-style=background:#fbb
| 115 || August 6 || @ Reds || 4–8 || DeSclafani (7–6) || Suárez (2–3) || — || 19,288 || 56–59 || L6
|-style=background:#fbb
| 116 || August 8 || @ Red Sox || 0–3 || Sale (6–11) || Peters (2–1) || Workman (7) || 34,744 || 56–60 || L7
|-style=background:#fbb
| 117 || August 9 || @ Red Sox || 4–16 || Walden (7–1) || Barría (4–6) || — || 36,650 || 56–61 || L8
|-style=background:#bfb
| 118 || August 10 || @ Red Sox || 12–4 || Cole (2–3) || Porcello (10–9) || — || 36,390 || 57–61 || W1
|-style=background:#bfb
| 119 || August 11 || @ Red Sox || 5–4  || Robles (4–0) || Weber (1–2) || — || 36,709 || 58–61 || W2
|-style=background:#fbb
| 120 || August 12 || Pirates || 2–10 || Keller (1–1) || Suárez (2–4) || — || 33,527 || 58–62 || L1
|-style=background:#fbb
| 121 || August 13 || Pirates || 7–10 || Williams (5–5) || Cole (2–4) || Vázquez (22) || 33,568 || 58–63 || L2
|-style=background:#bfb
| 122 || August 14 || Pirates || 7–4 || Peters (3–1) || Archer (3–9) || — || 33,542 || 59–63 || W1
|-style=background:#bfb
| 123 || August 15 || White Sox || 8–7 || Heaney (2–3) || López (7–10) || Robles (17) || 33,533 || 60–63 || W2
|-style=background:#fbb
| 124 || August 16 || White Sox || 2–7 || Giolito (13–6) || Sandoval (0–1) || — || 39,206 || 60–64 || L1
|-style=background:#bfb
| 125 || August 17 || White Sox || 6–5 || Cole (3–4) || Marshall (3–2) || Robles (18) || 39,419 || 61–64 || W1
|-style=background:#bfb
| 126 || August 18 || White Sox || 9–2 || Canning (5–6) || Cease (2–6) || — || 35,436 || 62–64 || W2
|-style=background:#fbb
| 127 || August 19 || @ Rangers || 7–8 (11) || Montero (2–0) || Ramirez (4–2) || — || 17,326 || 62–65 || L1
|-style=background:#bfb
| 128 || August 20 (1) || @ Rangers || 5–1 || Heaney (3–3) || Palumbo (0–2) || — || 17,429 || 63–65 || W1
|-style=background:#fbb
| 129 || August 20 (2) || @ Rangers || 2–3  (11) || Clase (1–2) || Buttrey (6–6) || — || 15,638 || 63–66 || L1
|-style=background:#fbb
| 130 || August 21 || @ Rangers || 7–8 || Hernández (1–0)  || Cahill (3–8) || — || 19,565 || 63–67 || L2
|-style=background:#fbb
| 131 || August 23 || @ Astros || 4–5 || Greinke (14–4) || Suárez (2–5) || Osuna (31) || 35,201 || 63–68 || L3
|-style=background:#fbb
| 132 || August 24 || @ Astros || 2–5 || Miley (13–4) || Peters (3–2) || Harris (1) || 37,862 || 63–69 || L4
|-style=background:#fbb
| 133 || August 25 || @ Astros || 2–11 || Valdez (4–6) || Barría (4–7) || — || 38,989 || 63–70 || L5
|-style=background:#bfb
| 134 || August 27 || Rangers || 5–2 || Del Pozo (1–0) || Minor (11–8) || Robles (19) || 39,008 || 64–70 || W1
|-style=background:#fbb
| 135 || August 28 || Rangers || 0–3 || Jurado (7–10) || Del Pozo (1–1) || Leclerc (9) || 37,535 || 64–71 || L1
|-style=background:#fbb
| 136 || August 30 || Red Sox || 6–7 (15) || Cashner (11–7) || Cahill (3–9) || — || 39,788 || 64–72 || L2
|-style=background:#bfb
| 137 || August 31 || Red Sox || 10–4 || García (2–1) || Brasier (2–4) || — || 43,036 || 65–72 || W1
|-

|-style=background:#fbb
| 138 || September 1 || Red Sox || 3–4 || Weber (2–2) || Heaney (3–4) || Workman (10) || 39,382 || 65–73 || L1
|-style=background:#fbb
| 139 || September 3 || @ Athletics || 5–7 || Petit (5–3) || Ramirez (4–3) || Hendriks (18) || 14,031 || 65–74 || L2
|-style=background:#fbb
| 140 || September 4 || @ Athletics || 0–4 || Roark (9–8) || Sandoval (0–2) || — || 12,597 || 65–75 || L3
|-style=background:#fbb
| 141 || September 5 || @ Athletics || 6–10 || Puk (1–0) || Buttrey (6–7) || — || 14,013 || 65–76 || L4
|-style=background:#bfb
| 142 || September 6 || @ White Sox || 5–4 || Robles (5–0) || Colomé (4–3) || — || 20,026 || 66–76 || W1
|-style=background:#bfb
| 143 || September 7 || @ White Sox || 8–7 || Heaney (4–4) || Covey (1–8) || Robles (20) || 25,230 || 67–76 || W2
|-style=background:#fbb
| 144 || September 8 || @ White Sox || 1–5 || Osich (2–0) || Barría (4–8) || — || 22,681 || 67–77 || L1
|-style=background:#fbb
| 145 || September 9 || Indians || 2–6 || Bieber (14–7) || Sandoval (0–3) || — || 35,753 || 67–78 || L2
|-style=background:#fbb
| 146 || September 10 || Indians || 0–8 || Plesac (8–6) || Suárez (2–6) || — || 35,508 || 67–79 || L3
|-style=background:#fbb
| 147 || September 11 || Indians || 3–4 || Carrasco (5–7) || Peters (3–3) || Cimber (1) || 33,952 || 67–80 || L4
|-style=background:#fbb
| 148 || September 13 || Rays || 4–11 || Morton (15–6) || Heaney (4–5) || — || 39,914 || 67–81 || L5
|-style=background:#fbb
| 149 || September 14 || Rays || 1–3 || Richards (6–12) || Barría (4–9) || Pagán (20) || 39,056 || 67–82 || L6
|-style=background:#bfb
| 150 || September 15 || Rays || 6–4 || Ramirez (5–3) || Yarbrough (11–4) || Robles (21) || 36,709 || 68–82 || W1
|-style=background:#fbb
| 151 || September 17 || @ Yankees || 0–8 || Loáisiga (2–1) || Ramirez (5–4) || — || 41,026 || 68–83 || L1
|-style=background:#bfb
| 152 || September 18 || @ Yankees || 3–2 || Bard (2–2) || Ottavino (6–5) || Robles (22) || 38,106 || 69–83 || W1
|-style=background:#fbb
| 153 || September 19 || @ Yankees || 1–9 || Tanaka (11–8) || Heaney (4–6) || — || 42,056 || 69–84 || L1
|-style=background:#fbb
| 154 || September 20 || @ Astros || 4–6 || Greinke (17–5) || Barría (4–10) || Osuna (36) || 40,106 || 69–85 || L2
|-style=background:#bfb
| 155 || September 21 || @ Astros || 8–4 || Bard (3–2) || Miley (14–6) || — || 43,264 || 70–85 || W1
|-style=background:#fbb
| 156 || September 22 || @ Astros || 5–13 || Verlander (20–6) || Rodríguez (0–1) || — || 43,169 || 70–86 || L1
|-style=background:#bfb
| 157 || September 24 || Athletics || 3–2 || Peters (4–3) || Bailey (13–9) || Robles (23) || 34,505 || 71–86 || W1
|-style=background:#fbb
| 158 || September 25 || Athletics || 2–3 || Soria (2–4) || Robles (5–1) || Hendriks (24) || 36,865 || 71–87 || L1
|-style=background:#bfb
| 159 || September 26 || Astros || 4–3  || Cahill (4–9) || Biagini (3–2) || — || 39,658 || 72–87 || W1
|-style=background:#fbb
| 160 || September 27 || Astros || 0–4 || Urquidy (2–1) || Sandoval (0–4) || — || 41,763 || 72–88 || L1
|-style=background:#fbb
| 161 || September 28 || Astros || 3–6 || Verlander (21–6) || Bard (3–3) || Osuna (38) || 35,814 || 72–89 || L2
|-style=background:#fbb
| 162 || September 29 || Astros || 5–8 || Cole (20–5) || Peters (4–4) || Harris (4) || 34,693 || 72–90 || L3
|-

|- style="text-align:center;"
| Legend:       = Win       = Loss       = PostponementBold = Angels team member

Record against opponents

Roster

Farm system

All coaches and rosters can be found on each team's website.

See also
Los Angeles Angels
Angel Stadium

References

External links
Los Angeles Angels Official Site
2019 Los Angeles Angels season at Baseball Reference

Los Angeles Angels seasons
Los Angeles Angels
Los Angeles Angels